Rolf Nilssen (25 January 1928 – 13 July 2012) is a Norwegian politician for the Labour Party.

He was born in Narvik. On the local level he was a member of the executive committee of Narvik municipal council from 1951 to 1963, and of the executive committee in Tromsø from 1967 to 1975. He chaired the regional party chapters in Salten, Tromsø and Troms.

He was elected to the Parliament of Norway from Troms in 1977, and was re-elected on two occasions.

Outside politics he spent large parts of his career working on Ofotbanen.

References

1928 births
2012 deaths
People from Narvik
Norwegian trade unionists
Members of the Storting
Labour Party (Norway) politicians
Nordland politicians
Politicians from Tromsø
20th-century Norwegian politicians